Rogue's Gallery: Pirate Ballads, Sea Songs and Chanteys is a compilation album of sea shanties produced by Hal Wilner. Songs are performed by artists representing a variety of genres, ranging from pop musicians like Sting, Bono, Jarvis Cocker, Lou Reed, Nick Cave and Bryan Ferry, to actors like John C. Reilly, to folk musicians like Richard Thompson, Loudon Wainwright III and Martin Carthy.

Track listing

Disc One

Disc Two

Producers
Hal Willner
Gore Verbinski
Johnny Depp
Brett Gurewitz
Graham Sutton

Son of Rogues Gallery
A follow-up album Son of Rogues Gallery: Pirate Ballads, Sea Songs & Chanteys was released 19 February 2013.

References

External links
 Rogue's Gallery on ANTI- Records website
 Rogue's Gallery Liner Notes
 Rogue's Gallery on Billboard
 Rogue's Gallery on Epitaph Records
 Son of Rogue's Gallery on ANTI- Records

2006 compilation albums
Albums produced by Hal Willner
Anti- (record label) compilation albums
Folk compilation albums
Sea shanties albums